The Santa Barbara Bowl is a 4,562-seat amphitheater, located in Santa Barbara, California. The amphitheater is open for concerts from approximately April through approximately October with an average of about 27 concerts per season.  Booked exclusively by Goldenvoice in Los Angeles, the Bowl hosts primarily popular music concerts. Since 1991, the Santa Barbara Bowl has been managed by the not-for-profit Santa Barbara Bowl Foundation.

History 
In the 1920s, La Primavera pageant used the location of what is now Peabody Stadium.

In 1924, fiesta week, 'Old Spanish Days,' began.

In 1935, Santa Barbara Bowl was carved into the hillside, a dry creek bed, as a WPA project. It was originally built to serve as a venue for the annual pageant of Old Spanish Days — Fiesta.

The amphitheater's original stage was a revolving wooden stage, but this was washed out during El Niño rains in 1939.  The stage was replaced with a concrete slab that remained in place until renovation work in 2001.

In the 1970s, Sepp Donahower, of Pinnacle Dance Concerts promoted pop music concerts, (Little Feat, Loggins & Messina, Average White Band, Beach Boys, and others).

Prominent concerts
Joni Mitchell's 1980 double live album and concert film, Shadows and Light, was recorded at the venue in September 1979 on the tour supporting her Mingus album. Her all-star backing band was made up of prominent jazz fusion musicians Pat Metheny, Lyle Mays, Jaco Pastorius, Don Alias, and Michael Brecker.

The British band Tears For Fears performed at the amphitheatre in May 1990, which was filmed for their Going To California concert video.

In 1979 on behalf of his Survival tour, Bob Marley and The Wailers performed at the bowl.

Maroon 5’s performance on May 13th 2005 was recorded for their Live - Friday the 13th live album and DVD.

Renovations 
The Santa Barbara Bowl has undergone over $42 million in renovations since the establishment of the Foundation in 1991.

See also
List of contemporary amphitheatres

References

External links
Santa Barbara Bowl Official Website

Buildings and structures in Santa Barbara, California
Amphitheaters in California
Music venues in California
Outdoor theatres
Works Progress Administration in California
Tourist attractions in Santa Barbara, California
Music venues completed in 1936
1936 establishments in California